Michael Vincent DiSalle (January 6, 1908September 16, 1981) was an American attorney and politician from Ohio. A member of the Democratic Party, he served as mayor of Toledo from 1948 to 1950, and as the 60th governor of Ohio from 1959 to 1963.

Early life 

DiSalle was born on January 6, 1908, in New York City, to Italian-American immigrant parents, Anthony and Assunta DiSalle. His family moved to Toledo, Ohio, when he was three years old. He graduated with a bachelor's degree from Georgetown University in 1931. He married Myrtle E. England; the couple had four daughters and one son.

DiSalle was admitted to the Ohio bar in 1932. In 1949, the University of Notre Dame conferred him an honorary doctorate of law.

Political career 

In 1936, DiSalle was elected to the Ohio House of Representatives; he served one term and lost an election for the Ohio Senate in 1938.

Following the loss, DiSalle held a series of offices in the city government of Toledo, Ohio. He was assistant law director from 1939 to 1941. In 1941, he was elected to the Toledo City Council; the council selected him as vice-mayor in 1943 and 1945.

In 1946, DiSalle ran in the U.S. House election in the Toledo-based 9th district, but he lost narrowly to the Republican incumbent, Homer A. Ramey.

DiSalle was elected as mayor of Toledo in 1947 and re-elected in 1949, and served from 1948 until his resignation on November 30, 1950, to accept a federal appointment. During his mayoralty, Toledo fully re-paid its debts.

In 1950, he ran unsuccessfully for the Democratic nomination for the U.S. Senate. He lost to then-state auditor Joseph T. Ferguson, who in turn lost the general election to the Republican incumbent, Robert A. Taft. In December 1950, President Harry S. Truman appointed DiSalle as director of the Office of Price Stabilization, a sub-agency of the Korean War-era Economic Stabilization Agency which established and enforced war-time price controls. DiSalle resigned as director on January 23, 1952, in order to run again for U.S. Senate. He won the Democratic nomination but lost the general election to the Republican incumbent, John W. Bricker.

In December 1952, President Truman (now a lame duck) appointed DiSalle as director of the Economic Stabilization Agency, replacing Roger Putnam. The appointment lasted less than one month, and President Dwight D. Eisenhower abolished the agency on April 30, 1953.

In 1956, DiSalle was the Democratic nominee for governor of Ohio, losing to then-state attorney general C. William O'Neill. In their 1958 re-match, DiSalle defeated O'Neill. The gubernatorial term had in 1954 been lengthened from two years to four years, starting with the 1958 election; so DiSalle served as governor from 1959 to 1963.

In July 1959, DiSalle signed a bill designating "with God, all things are possible" as the official motto of the State of Ohio. The motto is derived from the Gospel of Matthew, chapter 19, verse 26.

DiSalle was a favorite son candidate for the Democratic nomination for President in 1960. He ran only in the Ohio primary, which he won with 60.25% of the vote against Albert S. Porter, who had run against him in the gubernatorial primary in 1958. Of the total popular vote in the primaries, DiSalle placed sixth behind eventual nominee Sen. John F. Kennedy, as well as Gov. Pat Brown, perennial candidate George H. McLain, Sen. Hubert Humphrey, and Sen. George Smathers.

In 1962, DiSalle lost re-election as governor to then-state auditor Jim Rhodes, after voters disapproved of several aspects of his administration, including his opposition to capital punishment, a tax increase, and a policy which billed wards of state for living necessities.

Opposition to capital punishment 

DiSalle was an opponent of the death penalty and commuted a number of sentences, despite allowing six executions as governor. DiSalle personally investigated all cases of people scheduled to be executed by electric chair and even personally met with some of them. "To demonstrate his faith in rehabilitation, [DiSalle] made it a point to hire convicted murderers to serve on his household staff."

One of DiSalle's primary concerns regarding the death penalty was that poorer defendants did not have the same access to counsel as rich defendants, and therefore would suffer the death penalty disproportionately. He recalled: "I found that the men in death row had one thing in common: they were penniless".

After leaving the governorship, DiSalle co-founded and served as a chairman of the National Committee to Abolish Federal Death Penalty. His 1965 book, The Power of Life or Death, discusses this issue and chronicles his difficult experiences as the man charged with making the final decision regarding a sentence commutation.  He is quoted in the book Mercy on Trial: What It Means to Stop an Execution as saying, "No one who has never watched the hands of a clock marking the last minutes of a condemned man's existence, knowing that he alone has the temporary Godlike power to stop the clock, can realize the agony of deciding an appeal for executive clemency".

Electoral history

Later life 
In 1966, he joined the Washington, D.C., law firm of Chapman, Duff, and Paul. In 1979, he co-founded the Washington, D.C., law firm of DiSalle & Staudinger.

The same year, DiSalle also authored the book Second Choice, a history of the U.S. vice presidency.

DiSalle led a draft movement for a potential 1968 presidential campaign by Sen. Ted Kennedy. He served as the honorary chairman of Kennedy's 1980 presidential campaign.

DiSalle died on September 16, 1981, of a heart attack while vacationing in Pescara, Italy.

Legacy 

DiSalle has two current structures in Ohio named for him:

Toledo – Michael DiSalle Government Center housing federal, state, county, and city governmental offices.
Toledo – Michael V. DiSalle Bridge carrying I-75 across the Maumee River.

Also, the DiSalle Center (no longer standing) at the Ohio Expo Center and the Ohio State Fair in Columbus, Ohio, was named in honor of DiSalle.

See also 
Ohio gubernatorial elections

References

Further reading 
DiSalle, Michael V. The Power of Life or Death. New York: Random House, 1965.
DiSalle, Michael V. Second Choice. Stroud, Gloucester, United Kingdom: Hawthorn Books, 1966.
Marcus, Maeva. Truman and the Steel Seizure Case: The Limits of Presidential Power. New York: Columbia University Press, 1977. .
Sarat, Austin. Mercy on Trial: What It Means to Stop An Execution. Princeton, N.J.: Princeton University Press, 2005. .
Zimmerman, Richard. Call Me Mike: A Political Biography of Michael V. DiSalle. Kent, Ohio: Kent State University Press, 2003. .

External links 

|-

|-

1908 births
1981 deaths
20th-century American politicians
American anti–death penalty activists
American people of Italian descent
Candidates in the 1960 United States presidential election
Democratic Party governors of Ohio
Georgetown University alumni
Mayors of Toledo, Ohio